The Esociformes are a small order of ray-finned fish, with two families, Umbridae and Esocidae.  The pikes of genus Esox give the order its name.

This order is closely related to the Salmoniformes, the two comprising the superorder Protacanthopterygii, and are often included in their order.  The esociform fishes first appeared in the mid-Cretaceous — early products of the Euteleostei radiation of that time. Today, they are found in weed-choked freshwater habitats in North America and northern Eurasia.

Esocidae 
The three extant esocid genera (Esox, Novumbra, and Dallia) together comprise a holarctic distribution. Two additional genera have been described from fossils dating to the Cretaceous of North America.

Umbridae 
Umbra remains the only extant species in this family, and can be found in eastern North America and Europe. Three additional genera have been described from fossils dating from the Paleocene of Europe; however, genetic studies on the extant species of Umbra have recovered a split between the North American and European species dating to the Late Cretaceous and earliest half of the Paleogene.

Relationships 
While the family Esocidae traditionally only contained the genus Esox, recent genetic and paleontological research have recovered  Novumbra and Dallia as members of the family Esocidae, being closer related to Esox than Umbra. Umbra is the only remaining extant species in Umbridae. Various fossils have been described as members of Esociformes and are placed on the following tree accordingly.

References 

 

 
Ray-finned fish orders